Joyce Nichols (born Clayton, June 28, 1940 - July 29, 2012) was an American physician assistant (PA). Nichols was the first woman to be certified as a PA, graduating from the Duke University Medical Center program in 1970.

Biography 

Nichols was born as Joyce Clayton on June 28, 1940, in Roxboro, North Carolina. Nichols was married at age 16, though with encouragement from her parents, she finished high school and went onto to beauty school. Later, she attended Carolina College (later North Carolina Central University) where she made it half-way to a degree in psychology before her finances ran out. In 1965, she received a scholarship to study as a licensed practical nurse (LPN) and after graduation in 1966, she started working in the cardiac care unit at Duke Hospital. In the hospital, she learned about the physician's assistant (PA) class at the Duke University Medical Center.

The PA Program had been made up strictly of men, especially those with former experience as Navy corpsmen, was reluctant to enroll Nichols. However, she was encouraged to apply by Doctor Eugene Stead, the creator of the PA training program. Nichols was accepted and fought to be given the same stipend as the men in the program. During her training, she still worked in the cardiac unit to support her family. She and her family also lost their house due to a fire in 1969 and the faculty and students at the PA school helped to raise money to help Nichols' family. Nichols graduated from the program in 1970, becoming the first woman to earn a degree as a PA.

When she graduated, she was able to get funds with the help of Doctor E. Harvey Estes Jr., to open a rural, satellite health clinic. She worked in Rougemont and Bahama for two years, providing preventative healthcare to individuals who had not had easy access to medicine in the past. In 1972, she moved to the Lincoln Community Health Center and continued to provide healthcare to rural communities. Nichols continued here until her retirement in 1995. After retirement, Nichols stayed involved in her community in various capacities, including raising money for healthcare and volunteering in political campaigns.

Nichols died in her home in Durham, North Carolina on July 29, 2012.

References

External links 
Joyce Nichols Rural Health Clinic 
Oral history
Joyce Nichols: AAPA Paragon Awards

1940 births
2012 deaths
People from Roxboro, North Carolina
African-American nurses
American women nurses
Duke University people
People from Durham, North Carolina
20th-century African-American people
21st-century African-American people
20th-century African-American women
21st-century African-American women